County Road 42 or County Route 42 may refer to:

Canada
 County Road 42 (Essex County, Ontario)

United States
 County Road 42 (Lake County, Florida)
 County Road 42 (Marion County, Florida)
 County Road 42 (Dakota County, Minnesota)
 County Road 42 (Ramsey County, Minnesota)
 County Road 42 (Scott County, Minnesota)
 County Route 42 (Bergen County, New Jersey)
 County Route 42 (Monmouth County, New Jersey)
 County Route 42 (Allegany County, New York)
 County Route 42 (Cattaraugus County, New York)
 County Route 42 (Chautauqua County, New York)
 County Route 42 (Chenango County, New York)
 County Route 42 (Dutchess County, New York)
 County Route 42 (Erie County, New York)
 County Route 42 (Genesee County, New York)
 County Route 42 (Herkimer County, New York)
 County Route 42 (Livingston County, New York)
 County Route 42 (Madison County, New York)
 County Route 42 (Putnam County, New York)
 County Route 42 (Rensselaer County, New York)
 County Route 42 (Rockland County, New York)
 County Route 42 (Schoharie County, New York)
 County Route 42 (St. Lawrence County, New York)
 County Route 42 (Suffolk County, New York)
 County Route 42 (Ulster County, New York)
 County Route 42 (Warren County, New York)
 County Route 42 (Washington County, New York)
 County Route 42 (Wyoming County, New York)